Cantaluppi is an Italian surname. Notable people with the surname include:

Julieta Cantaluppi (born 1985), Italian rhythmic gymnast and coach
Mario Cantaluppi (born 1974), Swiss footballer and manager

See also
Cantaloupe (disambiguation)

Italian-language surnames